In 1861, Dominican general Pedro Santana suggested retaking control of the Dominican Republic to Queen Isabella II of Spain, after a period of 17 years of Dominican sovereignty. The newly independent Dominican Republic was recovering economically from the recently ended Dominican War of Independence (1844–1856), when the Dominican Republic had won its independence against Haiti. The Spanish Crown and authorities, which scorned and rejected the peace treaties signed after the dismantling of some of its colonies in the Spanish West Indies some 50 years prior, welcomed his proposal and set to reestablish the colony.

The end of the American Civil War in 1865 and the re-assertion of the Monroe Doctrine by the United States, which was no longer involved in internal conflict and which possessed enormously expanded and modernized military forces as a result of the war, prompted the evacuation of Spanish forces back to Cuba that same year.

Resistance

On July 4, 1861, former President Francisco del Rosario Sánchez was captured and executed after leading a failed invasion of Santo Domingo from Haiti. On August 16, 1863, 14 anti-annexationists led by Santiago Rodríguez Masagó made a daring raid on the Capotillo Hill, where they raised the Dominican flag. Except for Santo Domingo and some of the neighboring towns, the whole country rose in arms, and several towns in Cibao joined the rebellion. Soon, 6,000 Dominican insurgents rallied to Gaspar Polanco's army, which besieged Fort San Luis and its 800-man Spanish garrison and captured it on September 13. A steam frigate went to the support of Spanish troops holed up in the fort at Puerto Plata and drove off the rebels by firing grapeshot. Self-appointed president José Antonio Salcedo unsuccessfully lobbied for United States aid in the war, but the guerrillas killed a total of 1,000 Spaniards by March 1864, while another 9,000 had perished from fever. The 21,000-strong Spanish garrison received 6,000 reinforcements, and José de la Gándara y Navarro was appointed the new Spanish commander.

De la Gándara attempted to broker a ceasefire with the rebels, but Gaspar Polanco overthrew and assassinated Salcedo, who had made costly military mistakes and intended to recall the unpopular Buenaventura Báez to serve as president once more. After a failed attack on the Spanish at Monte Cristi, Polanco was overthrown by his own brother Juan Antonio Polanco, Pedro Antonio Pimentel, and Benito Moncion, who appointed Benigno Filomeno de Rojas as the new president in January 1865. By then, the American Civil War was almost at an end, frightening Spain. Queen Isabella II of Spain annulled the annexation on March 3, 1865, and, by July 15, there were no Spanish troops left on the island.

Governors

1861–1865
1861–1862: Pedro Santana
1862–1863: Felipe Ribero y Lemoine
1863–1864: Carlos de Vargas
1864–1865: José de la Gándara

See also
 History of the Dominican Republic
 First Republic
 Second Republic
 Third Republic

References

1865 disestablishments
19th century in the Dominican Republic
Colonial government in the West Indies
Dominican Republic–Spain relations
Santo Domingo, Spanish occupation of
History of the Dominican Republic
Spanish West Indies
States and territories established in 1861
1861 establishments in the Spanish Empire
Military occupation